The Third Battle of Doiran was fought from 18–19 September 1918, with the British and the Greeks assaulting the positions of the Bulgarian First Army near Dojran Lake. The battle was part of World War I and took place in the Balkan Theatre. The battle ended with the Bulgarians repulsing all attacks.

Prelude

The British and the Greeks set off from their base at Thessaloniki at the same time as the French and the Serbs. The British and the Greeks, under the command of George Milne set off the attack on the Bulgarian positions at Dojran while the French and the Serbs under the command of Franchet d'Esperey went to penetrate the Bulgarian defences in the Vardar Valley. The British and the Greeks were aiming to capture the Bulgarian positions in the hills above Dojran Lake.

This was not the first time the Allies had attacked Dojran - in 1916, an Anglo-French attempt was repulsed by the Second Thracian Infantry Division; the British had twice failed to capture it in 1917. The fortifications were well built (by Bulgarian engineers), the Bulgarians having spent the first months of 1916 and early 1917 strengthening the positions. The terrain around the area was rough, the fortifications being surrounded with three miles of scrub and rocks. Part of the defences were the dangerous Pip Ridge and the Grand Couronné.

Battle
On the left flank, the British XII Corps with the 22nd and 26th divisions, reinforced by the Greek Serres Division was to attack the difficult Pip Ridge. The British concentrated 231 pieces of artillery, including heavy 8-inch howitzers. The bombardment took place over two days, included gas shells and concluded with a rolling barrage, behind which the infantry was to advance. The British spent the time before the battle practising for the assault. Facing them was the Bulgarian 9th Pleven Division with 122 guns, in very well prepared defences, commanded by General Vladimir Vazov.

On September 18, the British XII Corps attacked with the 66th and 67th Brigades of the 22nd Division and the Greek Serres Division. The Bulgarian first line of trenches was overrun and the Serres Division penetrated to the second line. The Bulgarians responded with heavy artillery fire and counter-attacks that recaptured the ground lost. Meanwhile, the British 66th Brigade's 7th Battalion, South Wales Borderers lost heavily and failed in its attacks.  Attacks by the 11th Welsh Regiment and 9th Border Regiment did not go well either. The British 66th Brigade's 12th Cheshire Regiment followed by the 9th South Lancashire Regiment and 8th Kings Shropshire Light Infantry (KSLI) advanced into Bulgarian artillery and machine-gun fire.  The 66th Brigade lost 65% of its soldiers.  At the end of the day the XII Corps was back at its starting point. On September 19, the XII Corps attacked again but because the XVI Corps attacks north of the lake had failed, the XII Corps would attack alone. The Greek Serres Division repeated the previous day's performance, taking some Bulgarian trenches, before being thrown back by heavy artillery, machine-gun fire and counter-attacks. The British attacked with the 77th Brigade, the weakened 65th Brigade, and later the French 2/2nd Zouaves regiment. The 66th Brigades and 67th Brigades were fit only for defensive duties and did not participate. The 77th Brigade took some Bulgarian trenches but it was in an exposed position, being bombarded by artillery and eventually retreated before the Bulgarians counter-attacked. The brigade suffered about 50% casualties.  The 65th Brigade's attack failed also, as did the French Zouaves.

Meanwhile, also on September 18, the British XVI Corps attacked with the Greek Cretan Division and the British 84th Brigade in support. They faced the Bulgarian 1st Macedonian Brigade with 24 guns and 64 machine-guns.   The Greek division attacked with two of its regiments up front and a third in reserve, supported on its flank by the 84th. Firing in support were six batteries of British artillery.  The British 85th Brigade in reserve. At 05:00 the Greeks attacked, clearing out the Bulgarian outpost line. They then had to move across a long plain to attack the Bulgarian positions on a series of hills that overlooked the plain. The Greeks recklessly attacked across the plain, and  penetrated the Bulgarian lines but were thrown back with heavy artillery, rifle, and machine-gun fire. The British artillery deployed behind them to provide fire support. The Greeks rallied and made several more attacks on the Bulgarian lines with the same result as the first time. By the evening the Greeks withdrew, followed a few hours later by the British artillery. The XVI Corps did not attack on 19 September due to casualties. The attack failed due to the lack of artillery support, problems with inter-unit communication and the reckless first attack by the Greeks.

Casualties

The Allies' losses totalled between 6,559 and 7,819 British and Greek soldiers, against 2,726 for the Bulgarians.  Most of the British and Greek losses were to the XII Corps and Serres Division, with less than 1,000 coming from the XVI Corps and Cretan Division.

Retreat

Several days after the battle, the British realized the Bulgarian fortifications were quiet.  The British and Greek forces advanced only to find the Bulgarian positions abandoned. The French, Serbs and Greek forces had defeated part of the Bulgarian army during the Battle of Dobro Pole in the Vardar valley and were advancing towards Doiran. This prompted the command of Army Group Scholtz to order the Bulgarian First Army to retreat so that it would not be cut off from the rear. The British were weary and pursued slowly, and Bulgarian rear guards fought well enough to allow the rest of their troops to get away. The British Royal Air Force did attack the retreating Bulgarian columns, inflicting some casualties.

Aftermath

The Allies continued to advance into Bulgarian-held territory and some said the Bulgarian army had mutinied and were threatening Sofia. On September 30, the Bulgarians surrendered to the allies in Thessaloniki in order to avoid occupation.

The British paid great honour to General Vladimir Vazov when in 1936 he arrived in Victoria Station in London, by lowering the flags of all their regiments who participated in the battle. The chairman of the British legion Major Goldy said in his speech: "He is one of the few foreign officers whose name features in our history".

Notes

See also

Macedonian front (World War I)

Footnotes

References

 AJP Taylor. History of World War I. 
 
 
 Атанас Пейчев, 1300 години на стража, Военно издателство София 1981
 
 
 Пейковска, П., Печатът за участието на 34-и Пехотен Троянски полк в боевете при Дойран [The Press on the Participation of 34th Troyan Infantry Regiment in the Battle of Doiran]. - В: Културно-историческо наследство на Троянския край. Vol. 7, Троян, 1994, pp. 119–129. http://ivanpeykovski.blogspot.com/2013/01/34.html

External links
 Μάχη της Δοϊράνης (5/18-6/19 Σεπτεμβρίου 1918) [Battle of Doiran (5/18-6/19 September 1918)] , Hellenic Army, First World War 100th Anniversary portal 
 World War I history
 Salonika and Macedonia 1916-1918
 Димитър Зафиров. „Отбраната при Дойран". Военноисторически сборник, брой 1, 2004 (Dimiter Zafirov. The Defence at Doyran.) 

Battles of the Balkans Theatre (World War I)
Doiran
Doiran 1918
Battles of World War I involving the United Kingdom
Military history of North Macedonia
1918 in Bulgaria
Vardar Macedonia (1912–1918)
Macedonian front
September 1918 events
Doiran